Groove Grease is an album by American jazz organist Jimmy McGriff featuring performances recorded in 1971 and released on the Groove Merchant label.

Reception 

Allmusic's Rob Theakston said: "This 1971 session finds McGriff continuing to do like so many other jazz musicians of the time: embrace and adapt to the emergence of funk and soul into mainstream music, and recontextualize it in a jazz arena. The results are an unsurprisingly delicious slice of jazz-funk made from the finest ingredients. ... While McGriff's adventurous side is slightly tamed, it's that willingness to improv and blend together as a cohesive unit that makes Groove Grease such a tasty statement that is consistently fresh with repeated listenings".

Track listing
All compositions by Jimmy McGriff except where noted
 "Groove Grease" – 3:33
 "The Bird" (Jimmy McGriff, Sonny Lester) – 3:14
 "Plain Brown Bag" – 3:36
 "There Will Never Be Another You" (Harry Warren, Mack Gordon) – 4:48
 "Canadian Sunset" (Eddie Heywood, Norman Gimbel) – 3:30
 "Mr. Lucky" (Henry Mancini) – 3:44
 "Moonglow" (Will Hudson, Irving Mills, Eddie DeLange) – 3:24
 "Red Sails in the Sunset" (Hugh Williams, Jimmy Kennedy) – 3:07
 "Secret Love" (Sammy Fain, Paul Francis Webster) – 4:32

Personnel 
Jimmy McGriff – organ
Murray Watson – trumpet
Cliff Davis – tenor saxophone, flute
Johnny Beard – baritone saxophone, flute
Horace Ott – electric piano
Everett Barksdale, Wayne Bennett – guitar 
Richard Davis, Richard Evans – bass
Marion J. Booker – drums
Lawrence Killian – percussion

External link 
 Jimmy McGriff - Groove Grease

References 

Groove Merchant albums
Jimmy McGriff albums
1971 albums
Albums produced by Sonny Lester